The 2017–18 Kansas State Wildcats men's basketball team represented Kansas State University in the 2017–18 NCAA Division I men's basketball season. Their head coach was Bruce Weber in his sixth year at the helm of the Wildcats. The team played its home games in Bramlage Coliseum in Manhattan, Kansas. They were members of the Big 12 Conference. They finished the season 25–12, 10–8 in Big 12 play to finish in fourth place. They defeated TCU in the quarterfinals of the Big 12 tournament before losing to Kansas in the semifinals. They received an at-large bid to the NCAA tournament as the No. 9 seed in the South region. There they defeated Creighton, UMBC, and Kentucky to advance to the Elite Eight. In the Elite Eight, they lost to Loyola–Chicago.

Previous season
The Wildcats finished the 2016–17 season 21–14, 8–10 in Big 12 play to finish in sixth place. They defeated Baylor in the first round of the Big 12 tournament to advance to the quarterfinals where they lost to West Virginia. They received an at-large bid to the NCAA tournament as a No. 11 seed in the South Region. They defeated Wake Forest in the First Four before losing to No. 6-seeded Cincinnati.

Offseason

Departures

Incoming transfers

2017 recruiting class

Roster

Schedule and results

|-
!colspan=12 style=|Exhibition

|-
!colspan=12 style="|Regular season

|-
!colspan=12 style=| Big 12 Tournament

|-
!colspan=12 style=| NCAA tournament

Rankings

*AP does not release post-NCAA tournament rankings

References

Kansas State Wildcats men's basketball seasons
Kansas State
Kansas State
2017 in sports in Kansas
Kansas